The Rural Municipality of Brock No. 64 is a rural municipality (RM) in the Canadian province of Saskatchewan within Census Division No. 1 and  Division No. 1. It is located in the southeast portion of the province.

History 
The RM of Brock No. 64 incorporated as a rural municipality on December 12, 1910.

Geography

Communities and localities 
The following urban municipalities are surrounded by the RM.

Towns
 Arcola

Villages
 Kisbey, Saskatchewan

The following unincorporated communities are located within the RM.

Unincorporated hamlets
 Armilla

Demographics 

Government 
The RM of Brock No. 64 is governed by an elected municipal council and an appointed administrator that meets on the second Tuesday of every month. The reeve of the RM is Paul Cameron while its administrator is Miranda Debusschere. The RM's office is located in Kisbey.

See also 
 List of rural municipalities in Saskatchewan
 List of communities in Saskatchewan

References 

 
B
Division No. 1, Saskatchewan